Nadif Chowdhury (born 21 April 1987) is a Bangladeshi cricketer who has represented Bangladesh Under-19s and has played Twenty20 Internationals for his country. He is a slow left-arm orthodox bowler and right-handed batsman. In domestic competitions he plays for Dhaka Division in first-class cricket, and captains Victoria Sporting Club in List A cricket.

In October 2018, he was named in the squad for the Rangpur Riders team, following the draft for the 2018–19 Bangladesh Premier League. In November 2019, he was selected to play for the Rangpur Rangers in the 2019–20 Bangladesh Premier League.

References

External links

1987 births
Living people
Bangladeshi cricketers
Bangladesh Twenty20 International cricketers
Barisal Division cricketers
Dhaka Division cricketers
Sylhet Division cricketers
Sylhet Strikers cricketers
Fortune Barishal cricketers
Kala Bagan Krira Chakra cricketers
Victoria Sporting Club cricketers
Bangladesh Central Zone cricketers
People from Manikganj District